"Oh! Ma jolie Sarah" is a song by French singer Johnny Hallyday. It was released in 1971.

Commercial performance 
The song spent five consecutive weeks at no. 1 on the singles sales chart in France (from 27 May to 30 June 1971).

Charts

References 

1971 songs
1971 singles
Johnny Hallyday songs
French songs
Philips Records singles
Number-one singles in France
Song articles with missing songwriters